Ambo District is one of eight districts of the Ambo Province in Peru.

Geography 
Other mountains are listed below:

See also 
 Hatun Uchku
 Yanaqucha

References